The Salzwedeler Dumme is a left, western tributary of the Jeetzel (also: Jeetze) in Saxony-Anhalt, Germany.

Course 
The Salzwedeler Dumme runs a few kilometres south of the border with the neighbouring state of Lower Saxony in the Altmark region. It rises near Neuekrug-Höddelsen and passes inter alia the municipality of Dähre, before discharging into the northward-flowing Jeetzel at Salzwedel, hence the first part of the name.

See also 
 Wustrower Dumme
 List of rivers of Saxony-Anhalt

Rivers of Saxony-Anhalt
Rivers of Germany